Thorunna halourga is a species of sea slug, a dorid nudibranch, a shell-less marine gastropod mollusk in the family Chromodorididae.

Distribution 
This species was described from Rasch Passage, Madang, Papua New Guinea and Batangas, Philippines. It has been reported from tropical eastern Australia.

Description
The mantle is a pale lilac becoming purple in front of the rhinophores and behind the gills. The mantle margin, which is slightly undulate, has a broad white band. The rhinophores have a purple stalk and the lamellae are edged with orange. The gills are white with orange axes.

Ecology

References

External links
 

Chromodorididae
Gastropods described in 2001